McCoy Tyner and the Latin All-Stars is an album by McCoy Tyner, released on the Telarc label in 1999. It was recorded in July 1998 and contains performances by Tyner with alto saxophonist Gary Bartz, trumpeter Claudio Roditi, flautist Dave Valentin, bassist Avery Sharpe, drummer Ignacio Berroa and percussionists Johnny Almendra and Giovanni Hidalgo.

Reception

The AllMusic review by Jim Newsom states that "McCoy Tyner's percussive piano style has always worked well within an Afro-Cuban groove, and this recording provides an excellent setting for him and his all-star lineup to work in".

Track listing 
All compositions by McCoy Tyner except as indicated

 "Festival in Bahia" - 10:58  
 "Poinciana" (Simon), Bernier) - 6:55  
 "Afro Blue" (Santamaría) - 12:19  
 "A Song for Love" - 10:30  
 "La Habana Sol" - 8:33  
 "We Are Our Fathers' Sons" (Sharpe) - 5:21  
 "Blue Bossa" (Dorham) - 6:51

 Recorded at Avatar Studios, Studio A, New York City, July 29 & 30, 1998

Personnel 
 McCoy Tyner - piano
 Gary Bartz - saxophones
 Claudio Roditi - trumpet, flugelhorn
 Steve Turre - trombone
 Dave Valentin - flute
 Avery Sharpe - bass
 Ignacio Berroa - drums 
 Johnny Almendra - timbales
 Giovanni Hidalgo - congas & percussion

References 

McCoy Tyner albums
1999 albums
Telarc Records albums